Baons-le-Comte is a commune in the Seine-Maritime department in the Normandy region in northern France.

Geography
The A29 autoroute joins with the A150 autoroute within the commune's territory.

Heraldry

Population

Places of interest
 The chateau, dating from the nineteenth century.
 The church of St.Romain, dating from the twelfth century.

See also
Communes of the Seine-Maritime department

References

Communes of Seine-Maritime